Mathieu Lewin (born 14 November  1977 in Senlis, Oise, France) is a French mathematician and mathematical physicist who deals with partial differential equations, mathematical quantum field theory and mathematics of quantum mechanical many-body systems.

Biography 

Lewin studied mathematics at the École normale supérieure de Cachan, receiving his master's degree in 2000. He then received his PhD in 2004 at the Paris Dauphine University (Dauphine-Paris) PhD under the direction of Éric Séré. His dissertation was titled Some nonlinear models in quantum mechanics. From 2004 to 2005 he was a postdoctoral fellow at the University of Copenhagen under Jan Philip Solovej. From 2005, he conducted research for the Centre national de la recherche scientifique (CNRS) at the University of Cergy-Pontoise, then at the Paris-Dauphine university.

In July 2012, he has been awarded an EMS Prize "for his ground breaking work in rigorous aspects of quantum chemistry, mean field approximations to relativistic quantum field theory and statistical mechanics".

Works 
His works concern the mathematical properties of matter at the microscopic scale, and they are mostly based on quantum mechanics. He uses tools from the calculus of variations, nonlinear functional analysis, partial differential equations, and spectral theory. For instance, he studied several nonlinear models for atoms and molecules (e.g. the Multi-configurational self-consistent field and Hartree–Fock methods), or for infinite quantum systems (e.g. in quantum field theory and condensed matter).

Selection of papers

References 

Web page

1977 births
Living people
French mathematicians